Sacit Seldüz (2 January 1924 – September 2018) was a Turkish basketball player. He competed in the men's tournament at the 1952 Summer Olympics.

References

1924 births
2018 deaths
Turkish men's basketball players
Olympic basketball players of Turkey
Basketball players at the 1952 Summer Olympics
Place of birth missing